Suf Podgoreanu (born 20 January 2002) is an Israeli professional footballer who plays as a winger or as a forward for Israeli Premier League club Maccabi Haifa, on loan from Spezia. He represents both the Israel national under-21 team and the senior Israel national team.

Early life
Podgoreanu was born in Hadera, Israel, to a family of Ashkenazi Jewish descent, and is of Romanian-Jewish descent on his father's side. Both his father Danny Podgoreanu and his grandfather played for the local Hapoel clubs as well.

He also holds a Romanian passport, on account of his Ashkenazi Jewish (Romanian-Jewish) ancestry, which eases the move to certain European football leagues.

Club career

Maccabi Haifa 
Suf Podgoreanu came through the youth ranks of Maccabi Haifa, where he was a prolific goalscorer for the under-19s, before joining the first team during the 2019–20 season.

Roma
He moved to Italian side Roma at the of the season, joining their Primavera setup. After a season under Alberto De Rossi's management with 27 games, 3 goals and 6 assists, where he even joined the first team for a few games, he was transferred to their Serie A rival of Spezia Calcio.

Spezia
He made his debut for Italian side Spezia on 19 September 2021, replacing Janis Antiste in a 2-1 Serie A away win.

Return to Maccabi Haifa
On 2 September 2022, Podgoreanu returned to Maccabi Haifa on loan with an option to buy.

International career 
He has been a youth international for Israel since 2017. 

He also plays for the Israel U-21 since 2021.

He was called up for the senior Israel national team in October 2021, during their 2022 FIFA World Cup qualifiers - UEFA. Podgoreanu debuted for a full match with the senior team in a 3–2 home win for Israel against Faroe Islands on 15 November 2021, at the 2022 FIFA World Cup qualifiers - UEFA, where he had an assist as well.

See also 

 List of Jewish footballers
 List of Jews in sports
 List of Israelis

References

External links

2002 births
Living people
Israeli Ashkenazi Jews
Israeli footballers
Israel international footballers
Israel youth international footballers
Maccabi Haifa F.C. players
Spezia Calcio players
Israeli Premier League players
Serie A players
Footballers from Hadera
Israeli expatriate footballers
Expatriate footballers in Italy
Israeli expatriate sportspeople in Italy
Israeli people of Romanian-Jewish descent
Israeli Jews
Association football forwards